Khasma Nu Khani ( Swear) is a 2020 Indian Punjabi drama television series that premiered on 13 January 2020 on Zee Punjabi. It is available on the digital platform ZEE5 before its telecast. It is produced under the banner of Eternal Frame Production and stars Navdeesh Arora, Harsimran Oberoi and Sukhpreet in the lead roles. It is an official remake of Marathi series Mazhya Navryachi Bayko. It ended on 3 June 2022.

Plot 
The series depicts the life of Desho, whose life turns upside down on discovering her husband Armaan illicit relationship with Simple.

Cast 
 Harsimran Oberoi as Deshpreet Arora aka Desho, Armaan's wife (2020-2021)
 Unknown replaced Harsimran Oberoi as Desh preet Arora (2021-2022)

 Sukhpreet as Simple Sharma, Armaan's love interest(2021-2022)

 Navdeesh Arora as Armaan Arora, Desho's husband(2020-2021)
 Love Sandhu replaced Navdeesh Arora as Desh preet Arora (2021-2022)
 Akshay Dhiman as Ranveer Duggal (2020-2022)
 Roopi Maan as Mrs Duggal (2020-2022)
 Raman Dagga as Jagpratap Arora (2020-2022)
 Anju Moga as Poonam Arora (2020-2022)
 Mohan Kant as Sandeep Gulati (2020-2022)
 Jasleen as Deshpreet's mother (2020-2022)
 Naveen Dhingra as Deshpreet's father (2020-2022)
 Minal as Upinder Singh (2020-2022)
 Nisha as Sandeep's wife (2020-2022)
 Shreeansh Sharma as Purab (2020-2022)
 Samsher Singh as Maakhan Singh (2020-2022)
 Harjeet as Renu (2020-2022)
 Onika Maan as Maaya Kapoor (2020-2022)
 Anjali as Sweety (2020-2022)
 Harry Basra as Gurvindar Nehra aka Guggu (2020-2022)
 Gurpreet Maan as Tarunpaal Gill (2020-2022)
 Gagaandeep as Lakhbir (2020-2022)
 Gagan as Maid's Daughter (2020-2022)
 Pushpak Dilnoor as Twinkle Gill (2020-2022)
 Neelam Handa as Parminder Nehra (2020-2022)
 Prashni as Guneet Gill (2020-2022)
 Sukhpal as Sartaj Nehra aka Jolly (2020-2022)
 Vikas Neb as Omkar, Armaan's boss (2020-2022)
 Mridun Taksh as Shivam (2020-2022)

Adaptations

References

External links 
 
 Khasma Nu Khani at ZEE5

2020 Indian television series debuts
Punjabi-language television shows
Zee Punjabi original programming
2022 Indian television series endings